Hierarchy of hazard control is a system used in industry to minimize or eliminate exposure to hazards. It is a widely accepted system promoted by numerous safety organizations. This concept is taught to managers in industry, to be promoted as standard practice in the workplace. It has also been used to inform public policy, in fields such as road safety. Various illustrations are used to depict this system, most commonly a triangle.

The hazard controls in the hierarchy are, in order of decreasing effectiveness:
 Elimination
 Substitution
 Engineering controls
 Administrative controls
 Personal protective equipment

Components of the hierarchy

Elimination

Physical removal of the hazard is the most effective hazard control. For example, if employees must work high above the ground, the hazard can be eliminated by moving the piece they are working on to ground level to eliminate the need to work at heights.

Substitution

Substitution, the second most effective hazard control, involves replacing something that produces a hazard with something that does not produce a hazard or produces a lesser hazard—for example, replacing lead-based paint with titanium white. To be an effective control, the new product must not produce unintended consequences. Because airborne dust can be hazardous, if a product can be purchased with a larger particle size,  the smaller product may effectively be substituted with the larger product.

Engineering controls

The third most effective means of controlling hazards is engineered controls.  These do not eliminate hazards, but rather isolate people from hazards.  Capital costs of engineered controls tend to be higher than less effective controls in the hierarchy, however they may reduce future costs. For example, a crew might build a work platform rather than purchase, replace, and maintain fall arrest equipment.  "Enclosure and isolation" creates a physical barrier between personnel and hazards, such as using remotely controlled equipment.  Fume hoods can remove airborne contaminants as a means of engineered control.

Administrative controls

Administrative controls are changes to the way people work. Examples of administrative controls include procedure changes, employee training, and installation of signs and warning labels (such as those in the Workplace Hazardous Materials Information System).  Administrative controls do not remove hazards, but limit or prevent people's exposure to the hazards, such as completing road construction at night when fewer people are driving.

Personal protective equipment

Personal protective equipment (PPE) includes gloves, Nomex clothing, overalls, Tyvek suits, respirators, hard hats, safety glasses, high-visibility clothing, and safety footwear.  PPE is the least effective means of controlling hazards because of the high potential for damage to render PPE ineffective.  Additionally, some PPE, such as respirators, increase physiological effort to complete a task and, therefore, may require medical examinations to ensure workers can use the PPE without risking their health.

Role in Prevention through Design 
The hierarchy of controls is a core component of Prevention through Design, the concept of applying methods to minimize occupational hazards early in the design process. Prevention through Design emphasizes addressing hazards at the top of the hierarchy of controls (mainly through elimination and substitution) at the earliest stages of project development.

Variations on the NIOSH Control Hierarchy 
While the control hierarchy shown above is traditionally used in the United States and Canada, other countries or entities may use a slightly different structure. In particular, some add isolation above engineering controls instead of combining the two. The variation of the hierarchy used in the ARECC decision-making framework and process for industrial hygiene (IH) includes modification of the material or procedure to reduce hazards or exposures (sometimes considered a subset of the hazard substitution option but explicitly considered there to mean that the efficacy of the modification for the situation at hand must be confirmed by the user). The ARECC version of the hierarchy also includes warnings as a distinct element to clarify the nature of the warning. In other systems, warnings are sometimes considered part of engineering controls and sometimes part of administrative controls.

See also
 ARECC - Decision-making framework and process used in the field of industrial hygiene (IH) to anticipate and recognize hazards, evaluate exposures, and control and confirm protection from risks
 
 
 
 
 Normalization of deviance – one reason people stop using effective prevention measures

References

External links
 Canadian Centre for Occupational Health & Safety document
 Hierarchy of prevention and control measures on OSH Wiki (EU)

Hazard analysis
Occupational safety and health